Clarkson Golden Knights ice hockey may refer to either of the ice hockey teams that represent Clarkson University:

Clarkson Golden Knights men's ice hockey
Clarkson Golden Knights women's ice hockey